Khairin Nadim bin Rahim (born 8 May 2004) is a Singaporean professional footballer who plays as a striker or left-winger for Singapore Premier League club Young Lions FC, on loan from Lion City Sailors FC and the Singapore U23 National Team. He was part of Goal Singapore's NxGn 2020 list as one of the country's biggest talents. Khairin is a childhood Liverpool fan, with Brazil star Neymar as his footballing idol growing up.

Club career

Young Lions
Khairin signed for the Young Lions in 2020. He made his professional debut on March 1, 2020 in a 1–4 loss against Hougang United when he was substituted in the 75th minute. At 15 years and 298 days, he became the youngest ever debutant in the competition's 25-year history. He then became the third-youngest player to score in Singapore’s professional football league in the Young Lions’ 3-1 loss to Tampines in the same year, missing Singapore captain Hariss Harun’s record by just 20 days. 

Khairin continued his fine progress and broke yet another record when he scored against Geylang International FC on 20 March 2021. At just 16 years and 316 days old, Khairin became the youngest player ever to score five goals in Singapore Premier League (SPL), eclipsing the previous record of 17 years and 102 days set by Geylang’s Zikos Chua in 2019. His performance at the start of the 2021 Singapore Premier League earned him the SPL Young Player of the Month award in March.

International career

Youth
Khairin represent Singapore U16 at the 2020 AFC U-16 Championship qualification in 2019.

Career statistics

Club

Notes

International

U23 International caps

U19 International caps

U19 International goals

U17 International caps

U17 International goals

References

2004 births
Living people
Singaporean footballers
Association football forwards
Singapore Premier League players
Young Lions FC players
Singapore youth international footballers
Competitors at the 2021 Southeast Asian Games
Southeast Asian Games competitors for Singapore